William Ashe may refer to:
William Shepperd Ashe (1814–1862), U.S. Representative from North Carolina
William Willard Ashe (1872–1932), American forester and botanist
William Ashe (1647–1713), MP for Heytesbury
William Ashe (1715–1750), MP for Heytesbury
William Ashe (Michigan politician) in United States House of Representatives elections, 2000
William Ashe (b. 1675), MP for Heytesbury
William Ashe (d. 1750), see William Ashe-à Court

See also
William Ash (disambiguation)